Owen Ashmore  (1920 – July 1995) was a British industrial archaeologist at the University of Manchester who was Secretary and Vice-President of the Lancashire and Cheshire Antiquarian Society, Treasurer of the Chetham Society and a Fellow of the Society of Antiquaries.

Life 
Ashmore was born in Cheshire in 1920, and taught and directed the Local History Diploma in the Extra Mural Department at the University of Manchester. He was a founder Member of the Manchester Industrial Archaeology Society.

He was elected a Fellow of the Society of Antiquaries (FSA). He was a Member of the Lancashire and Cheshire Antiquarian Society, elected Council Member (from 1961), Secretary (1963–72) and Vice-President (1975–94). He was also a Member of the Chetham Society elected as a Council Member (from 1969) then serving as Treasurer (1972–83). He died in 1995 aged 75.

Select bibliography 
 “The Whalley Abbey bursar's account for 1520”, Transactions of the Historic Society of Lancashire and Cheshire, 114 (1962).
 A memoir of Robert Blincoe, by John Brown, with a brief account of the early textile industry in Derbyshire (with an Introduction by A.E. Musson), Derbyshire Archaeological Society, Duffield, 1966.
 Low Moor, Clitheroe: a nineteenth-century factory community, Lancashire and Cheshire Antiquarian Society, Manchester, 1966.
 Development of power in Britain, London, 1967.
 A guide to Whalley Abbey, Blackburn 1968.
 Baines's Lancashire: History, directory, and gazetteer, of the county palatine of Lancaster (with a new introduction by Owen Ashmore), New York; A.M. Kelley, 1968.
 The industrial archaeology of the British Isles: Lancashire, Newton Abbot, 1969.
 (with Trevor Bolton), Hugh Mason and the Oxford mills and community, Ashton-under-Lyne, Lancashire and Cheshire Antiquarian Society, Wilmslow, 1975.
 The industrial archaeology of Stockport, University of Manchester, 1975.
 Historic industries of Marple and Mellor,  Workers' Educational Association, Stockport, 1977
 The industrial archaeology of north-west England, Chetham Society, Third Series, 29 (1982).

References 

1920 births
1995 deaths
British archaeologists
Academics of the University of Manchester
Fellows of the Society of Antiquaries of London
Industrial archaeology
Lancashire and Cheshire Antiquarian Society
Chetham Society